Ascott Gurney Penang  is a serviced apartment within the city of George Town in Penang, Malaysia.  It is the first The Ascott serviced apartment in Penang.

See also 
List of tallest buildings in George Town
 Gurney Drive

References

External links 

Residential skyscrapers in Malaysia
Buildings and structures in George Town, Penang